Denise W. Merrill (born October 8, 1948) is an American politician who most recently served as the Connecticut Secretary of the State from 2011 to 2022. A member of the Democratic Party, Merrill was previously a member of the Connecticut House of Representatives.

Education

Merrill graduated from the University of Connecticut. She attended but did not graduate from the San Francisco Law School, now merged with Alliant International University, and was admitted to the State Bar of California.

Career

Connecticut House of Representatives
Merrill was first elected to office in 1993 in a special election and served as the House Majority Leader after being elected to that position prior to the 2009 legislative session and until becoming Secretary of the State. Previously, Merrill had served as the House Chair on the Appropriations Committee from 2005 to 2008. In the State House she represented Fifty-Fourth Assembly District, which includes the towns of Mansfield and Chaplin.

Secretary of State

Following the state Democratic primary held on August 10, 2010, Merrill became her party's nominee for Secretary of the State for the November 2010 election. She went on to defeat Republican candidate Jerry Farrell Jr. on November 2. As a serving Secretary of State, she is a part of the National Association of Secretaries of State and was also elected its president for the 2016–2017 term.

On June 23, 2021, she announced her intent not to seek re-election in 2022.

On June 28, 2022, Merrill announced her resignation effective June 30, in order to spend more time caring for her ailing husband.

Other work
She currently serves on the Board of Advisors of Let America Vote, an organization founded by former Missouri Secretary of State Jason Kander that aims to end voter suppression.

Personal life

Merrill is also a classically trained pianist. She has three grown children and five grandchildren.

Electoral history 

*Merrill was also nominated on A Connecticut Party line.

*Merrill was also listed on the Working Families Party line.

*Merrill was also listed on the Working Families Party line.

*Merrill was also listed on the Working Families Party line; Lumaj was also listed on the Independent Party line.

*Merrill was also listed on the Working Families Party line; Chapman was also listed on the Independent Party line.

References

External links

 Office of the Secretary of the State

|-

|-

1948 births
21st-century American politicians
21st-century American women politicians
California lawyers
Connecticut lawyers
Living people
Democratic Party members of the Connecticut House of Representatives
People from Mansfield, Connecticut
Secretaries of the State of Connecticut
University of Connecticut alumni
Women state legislators in Connecticut